Lais dos Santos Araujo (born 16 March 1996) is a Brazilian soccer player for Famalicão. She previously played for Adelaide United of the W-league.

Early life
Araujo was born in Salvador, Brazil and lived her early years in a favela. She learned to play soccer on the streets and featured on the documentary Warriors of a Beautiful Game which brought her to the attention of Pelé.

The documentary looked at the state of the women's game in several countries on various continent and how the development of women's equality mirrored the focus women's soccer received.

Club career
Araujo has spent time playing college soccer for ASA College and the Florida Gators.

She spent the 2019 season playing for Arna-Bjørnar, 21 league games, before signing with Adelaide United for the 2019–20 W-League season.

In September 2020, Araujo joined Cypriot club Apollon Limassol.

International career
Araujo played for the Brazilian under 20 team, which she captained. She played in the 2016 FIFA U-20 Women's World Cup team.

References

External links
 

Living people
1996 births
Brazilian expatriate women's footballers
Expatriate women's soccer players in the United States
Brazilian expatriate sportspeople in the United States
Arna-Bjørnar players
Toppserien players
Brazilian expatriate sportspeople in Norway
Brazilian expatriate sportspeople in Australia
Adelaide United FC (A-League Women) players
Apollon Ladies F.C. players
Florida Gators women's soccer players
Expatriate women's footballers in Norway
Expatriate women's soccer players in Australia
Brazilian expatriate sportspeople in Cyprus
Brazilian expatriate sportspeople in Portugal
Brazilian expatriate sportspeople in Spain
Madrid CFF players
Primera División (women) players
Expatriate women's footballers in Spain
Expatriate women's footballers in Cyprus
Expatriate women's footballers in Portugal
F.C. Famalicão (women) players
A-League Women players
Campeonato Nacional de Futebol Feminino players
Brazilian women's footballers
Women's association football midfielders
Sportspeople from Salvador, Bahia